Pirkanmaa, also known as Tampere Region in government documents, is a region of Finland. It borders the regions of Satakunta, South Ostrobothnia, Central Finland, Päijät-Häme, Kanta-Häme and Southwest Finland. Most of the water area in the Kokemäki River watershed is located in the Pirkanmaa region, although Lake Vanajavesi is partly in the Kanta-Häme region. The region got its name from Pirkkala, which in the Middle Ages comprised most of present-day Pirkanmaa. Tampere is the regional center and capital of Pirkanmaa, and at the same time the largest city in the region.

The total population of Pirkanmaa was 529,100 on 30 June 2022, which makes it the second largest among Finland's regions after Uusimaa. The population density is well over twice the Finnish average, and most of its population is largely concentrated in the Tampere sub-region.

Economy 
The Gross domestic product (GDP) of the region was 18.3 billion € in 2016, accounting for 8.5% of Finnish economic output. GDP per capita adjusted for purchasing power was €36,040  or 92% of the EU27 average in the same year. Pirkanmaa's GDP was the second highest among the regions and the seventh highest among the nineteen regions per capita.

The economic structure of Pirkanmaa typically focuses on services for post-industrial society. A nationally significant ICT concentration has grown in Tampere. Thanks to its population base, the city is also a major trading center. Industry's share of value added and jobs in Pirkanmaa is higher than the Finnish average. The region is one of Finland's main centers of manufacturing, has a long tradition of industrial activity and a good education network. The industry is largely concentrated in Tampere and its surroundings, such as towns of Nokia and Valkeakoski. Mänttä-Vilppula is also a major industrial center. Agriculture accounts for a small share of economic activity. In the western part of the region, agricultural production is dominated by dairy cattle, in the south by cereals, and in the north by forestry.

Language 

Pirkanmaa is a rather linguistically homogeneous region: in 2018, almost 490,000 people, or about 95 per cent of the county's population, spoke Finnish as their mother tongue. For Finno-speakers, the national population share of Pirkanmaa was 10,1 per cent. In the 2010s, the number of Finnish-speakers has increased only in Uusimaa, Pirkanmaa and Northern Ostrobothnia, and slightly in Southwest Finland and Åland.

The Swedish-speaking settlement settled in Finland in the Middle Ages did not extend to the area of present-day Pirkanmaa, so the number and share of Finno-Swedes in the province is small. In 2018, about two thousand people spoke Swedish as their mother tongue in Pirkanmaa. In 2017, 27 people spoke Sámi as their mother tongue in Pirkanmaa. The second most spoken language in Pirkanmaa is Russian, in 2018 it was used by four thousand people as their mother tongue.

Regional council 
The regional council is the main governing body for region and focuses primarily on urban planning. Like all regional councils, it is mandated by law.

Regional division

Historical provinces

Municipalities 

The region of Pirkanmaa is made up of 23 municipalities, of which 12 have city or town status (marked in bold).

Tampere sub-region:
 Hämeenkyrö (Tavastkyro)
Population: 
 Kangasala
Population: 
 Kuhmoinen (Kuhmois)
Population: 
 Lempäälä (Lembois)
Population: 
 Nokia
Population: 
 Orivesi
Population: 
 Pirkkala (Birkala)
Population: 
 Pälkäne
Population: 
 Tampere (Tammerfors)
Population: 
 Vesilahti (Vesilax)
Population: 
 Ylöjärvi
Population: 

North Western Pirkanmaa sub-region:
 Ikaalinen (Ikalis)
Population: 
 Kihniö
Population: 
 Parkano
Population: 
Upper Pirkanmaa sub-region:
 Juupajoki
Population: 
 Mänttä-Vilppula (Mänttä-Filpula)
Population: 
 Ruovesi
Population: 
 Virrat (Virdois)
Population: 

Southern Pirkanmaa sub-region:
 Akaa (Ackas)
Population: 
 Urjala (Urdiala)
Population: 
 Valkeakoski
Population: 
South Western Pirkanmaa sub-region:
 Punkalaidun (Pungalaitio)
Population: 
 Sastamala
Population:

Politics 
Results of the 2019 Finnish parliamentary election in Pirkanmaa:
 Social Democratic Party 22.10%
 National Coalition Party 18.47%
 Finns Party 17.32%
 Green League 12.42%
 Centre Party 8.87%
 Left Alliance 8.14%
 Christian Democrats 5.74%
 Movement Now 2.40%
 Blue Reform 1.12%
 Seven Star Movement 0.46%
 Swedish People's Party 0.11%
 Other parties 2.85%

See also
 Birkarls
 Finnish national road 12
 Kokemäki River
 Lake Längelmävesi
 Lake Näsijärvi
 Pirkanmaa Constituency
 Tampere sub-region

References

External links 

 Council of Tampere Region (Pirkanmaan liitto)

 
Western Finland Province
Regions of Finland